In Arizona folklore, the Red Ghost is a figure alleged to have roamed the Arizonan frontier in the late 19th century. It was said to have been a large, red camel, with a bleached human skeleton upon its back. Legends of it were widespread across Arizona, up until its supposed death before the dawn of the 20th century. In 1893 a farmer shot the camel and found that there was an actual human skeleton strapped to its back.

Historical background 
During the Westward expansion of the United States, military forces were looking for ways to ease transportation in arid regions. Throughout the early 19th century various proposals were made for camels to be used as pack animals, with a proposal by then Secretary of War Jefferson Davis finally being approved in 1855 with a budget of $30,000 in an experiment that would later become known as the Camel Corps. The process of acquiring camels began around the Mediterranean and eventually 70 were procured. The project was originally a success, but due to the American Civil War it was largely abandoned, with many supporters like Jefferson Davis joining the Confederacy. The camels were sold off or abandoned, with some being seen for decades afterwards.

History and legend 
The legend began in 1883, when two men left their ranch house near Eagle Creek to check on their cattle. While they were out, one of the ranchers' wives heard their dogs loudly barking, followed by a loud scream. She rushed to the window and saw what she described as a "huge, reddish colored beast" ridden by a "devilish-looking creature", and proceeded to lock her front door and wait for the men to come back. When the two men returned they found the other wife had been trampled to death. The men followed the footprints left by the creature the next day and found red hair in a bush. A few days later a group of prospectors reported something tearing through their campground; red hair was later found at the site. The creature was again spotted just a few days later, this time being described as 30 feet tall, and knocking over two wagons, with red hair again being found. The legend would quickly spread with various tales being told; one described the creature killing and eating a grizzly bear, while another said it disappeared into thin air when chased, but all the tales agreed that the skeleton of a man was on its back. A cowboy tried to lasso the beast, but was knocked to the ground and nearly killed by it, not before seeing the figure on the back was a skeleton. A few months later a group of five men shot at the beast, missing the camel but shooting the head of the skeleton off, finding some hair and skin still attached to it. 

The legend remained popular until 1893 when farmer Mizoo Hastings found the creature eating in his yard and proceeded to shoot it, killing it in a single shot. It was then discovered that the beast was a camel, with leather straps on the side stuck so tight that it was scarred. It remains unknown why a dead man was attached to the back, but various tales have appeared to explain it over the years, some saying it was a prospector dying of thirst who tied himself to the back hoping it would bring him to some water, while others say it was a soldier learning to ride a camel when it suddenly bolted off. The verifiability of some parts of the legend remains questionable, as some records are missing or have been lost over time.

Legacy 
A sculpture of the camel was erected in Quartzite, Arizona, not too far from the grave of Hi Jolly, an Ottoman camel driver who worked for the Camel Corps.

References 

Undead
Ghosts
Supernatural legends
Camel cavalry
American ghosts
Individual camels
Arizona folklore
1880s in Arizona Territory
1890s in Arizona Territory